Sphaenorhynchus surdus, or Cochran's lime treefrog,  is a species of frog in the family Hylidae. It is endemic to southern Brazil and is known from the eastern Paraná, Santa Catarina, and northeastern Rio Grande do Sul states. Before Sphaenorhynchus caramaschii was described in 2007, all Sphaenorhynchus from the south of the state of São Paulo state all way south to Rio Grande do Sul were identified as S. surdus.

Description
Adult males measure  in snout–vent length. There is a dark dorso-lateral line running from the snout almost to the groin. No externally visible tympanum is present. A late-stage tadpole (Gosner stage 37) measured  in total length, of which the body made . Males call from the floating vegetation during the hot, rainy season. The call is short, usually less than 2 seconds in duration. The dominant frequency is 2.2–2.4 kHz.

Habitat and conservation
Although an abundant species, water pollution is a threat to it.

References

surdus
Amphibians of Brazil
Endemic fauna of Brazil
Amphibians described in 1953
Taxa named by Doris Mable Cochran
Taxonomy articles created by Polbot